UFC Fight Night: Bisping vs. Leites (also known as UFC Fight Night 72) was a mixed martial arts event held on 18 July 2015 at the OVO Hydro in Glasgow, Scotland.

Background
After previously hosting 15 events at various locations around the United Kingdom, the event was the first that the promotion has hosted in Scotland. Ticket demand was high for the event, with all tickets selling out within a few hours of going on sale.

The event was headlined by a middleweight bout between veteran contender Michael Bisping and former title challenger Thales Leites.

Ian Entwistle was expected to face Marcus Brimage at the event. However, Entwistle pulled out of the fight in late June for undisclosed reasons. He was replaced by promotional newcomer Jimmie Rivera.

Konstantin Erokhin was expected to face Daniel Omielańczuk at the event. However, Erokhin pulled out of the fight in late June citing an injury and was replaced by promotional newcomer Chris de la Rocha.

Jake Matthews was expected to face Mickaël Lebout at the event. However, Matthews pulled out of the fight on 9 July due to an injury and was replaced by promotional newcomer Teemu Packalén.

Bec Rawlings was expected to face Joanne Calderwood at the event. However, Rawlings pulled out of the fight on 10 July due to an injury and was replaced by promotional newcomer Cortney Casey.

Results

Bonus awards
The following fighters were awarded $50,000 bonuses:
Fight of the Night: Joanne Calderwood vs. Cortney Casey
Performance of the Night: Joseph Duffy and Stevie Ray

See also
List of UFC events
2015 in UFC

References

2015 in mixed martial arts
International sports competitions in Glasgow
July 2015 sports events in Europe
Mixed martial arts in the United Kingdom
UFC Fight Night
2010s in Glasgow